Jenny Craig (born Genevieve Guidroz; August 7, 1932) is an American weight loss guru and founder of Jenny Craig, Inc. Craig was born in Berwick, Louisiana, was raised in New Orleans, and married Sidney Craig in 1979. In 1983, she and her husband created a nutrition, fitness, and weight loss program in Australia and began offering the program in the United States in 1985. The company became a part of Nestlé Nutrition in 2006.

Philanthropy

In 1992, Craig and her husband committed $10 million to Fresno State University for its School of Business and Administrative Services, later renamed the Sid Craig School of Business. In 1996, the couple committed another $10 million to the University of San Diego, $7 million of which was used to build the Jenny Craig Pavilion, a recreation and sports pavilion that was dedicated in October 2000.

Horse racing
In 1995, Craig and her husband bought a thoroughbred horse ranch and breeding operation in Rancho Santa Fe, California formerly owned by sportsman Gene Klein. This area is home to the Del Mar Thoroughbred Club. Craig has been involved in racing and she and her husband have owned a number of successful thoroughbreds. One of their colts, Dr. Devious, finished seventh in the 1992 Kentucky Derby and also raced in England, where he won the 1992 Epsom Derby. That same year, their future National Museum of Racing and Hall of Fame filly Paseana won the Breeders' Cup Distaff at Gulfstream Park. In 2003, their horse Candy Ride won six races in a row including the Grade I Pacific Classic Stakes in which he set a new Del Mar track record for one and a quarter miles. Another Craig owned horse, Sidney's Candy, named after Sid Craig, ran in the 2010 Kentucky Derby.

Health issues
In April 1995, while reposing in a favorite armchair and napping, she was startled awake, which caused a strange medical anomaly that mimicked lockjaw but was not, as Craig was eventually able to pry her mouth open. Though there seemed to be no imminent threat, Craig's condition gradually worsened making it difficult for her to speak and eat. Her dentist diagnosed temporomandibular joint syndrome, for which she was referred to a specialist, though to little avail. She was, in turn, referred to a series of physicians (reportedly 18), all of whom provided various suggestions but ultimately no solution. In the spring of 1998, she was introduced to Dr. Dennis M. Nigro, typically a cosmetic surgeon, who assessed that Craig had suffered atrophying of her mouth muscles. Corrective surgery was provided by installing bioabsorbable screws into her cheeks. She underwent a four-and-a-half-hour operation and another year of speech therapy. Craig has since fully recovered from the debilitating condition.

References

External links
 Official Jenny Craig Website

1932 births
Living people
People from Berwick, Louisiana
Cajun people
American food industry businesspeople
American racehorse owners and breeders
American women philanthropists
Women business executives
American women company founders
American company founders
Diet food advocates
21st-century American women